Nittendorf is a municipality in the district of Regensburg in Bavaria in Germany.

Loch Castle, a rare example of a Bavarian cave castle, is located within the municipality.

References

Regensburg (district)